Bilberry soup may refer to:

 Blåbärssoppa, (Swedish for "blue berry soup") a Scandinavian soup made from bilberries 
 Krentjebrij, a Dutch traditional soup or porridge-like dessert 
 Kissel, an eastern European viscous fruit dish

See also
Bilberry (disambiguation)
Fruit soup